Amos Gustine (1789March 3, 1844) was a Democratic member of the U.S. House of Representatives from Pennsylvania from 1841 to 1843.

Biography
Born in Pennsylvania in 1789, Gustine was a member of the board of managers of the Mifflin Bridge Company in Mifflin County, Pennsylvania in 1828. He then served as the sheriff of Juniata County, Pennsylvania from 1831 to 1834. Awarded the contract for the first courthouse erected at Mifflintown, Pennsylvania in 1832, he served as a member of the first town council of Mifflintown in 1833, and was also employed as a merchant in that same year.

Gustine was subsequently elected as treasurer of Juniata County in 1837.

Elected as a Democrat to the Twenty-seventh Congress, Gustine returned to farming and milling after his tenure of service ended.

Death and interment
Gustine died in Jericho Mills, Pennsylvania on March 3, 1844, and was interred in the Presbyterian Cemetery in Mifflintown, Pennsylvania.

References

The Political Graveyard

1789 births
1844 deaths
American Presbyterians
Democratic Party members of the United States House of Representatives from Pennsylvania
19th-century American politicians